Hannah Mary Bardell (born 1 June 1983) is a Scottish politician who has served as Member of Parliament (MP) for Livingston since 2015. A member of the Scottish National Party (SNP), she served as its spokesperson for Digital, Culture, Media and Sport from 2018 to 2019.

Early life and education
Bardell was born on 1 June 1983 in Craigshill, Livingston. She attended Broxburn Academy and the University of Stirling. Bardell served as the National Union of Students' women's officer while studying at university. Her first jobs were with STV Glasgow and GMTV London, where she became an assistant producer of The Sunday Programme, a current affairs series.

Political career
After first meeting Alex Salmond in 2007, Bardell joined the SNP's election campaign for the 2007 Scottish Parliament election. For three years, she worked for Salmond and Ian Hudghton MEP in his constituency office. Bardell then worked for the US State Department in their Edinburgh Consulate, before joining the oil and gas industry, initially with Subsea 7, then for Oil & Gas Service company Stork as Head of Communications & Marketing for the UK, Africa & Norway. She left the oil & gas industry after only 3 years, in acrimonious circumstances, having admitted to having voluntarily signed a non-disclosure agreement (NDA) on leaving her position with Stork after allegations of bullying. She refused to state whether any payment was made to her in relation to the NDA.

Bardell contested the Livingston seat for the SNP in the 2015 UK general election. Her mother, Lis Bardell had previously finished in second place for the SNP in the same constituency at the 2010 UK general election. Bardell was elected with 32,736 votes (56.9%), a majority of 16,843 votes over the sitting Labour Party MP, Graeme Morrice, overturning a Labour majority of 10,791 votes at the 2010 general election. Bardell became Shadow SNP Westminster Group Leader (Business, Innovation and Skills) in October 2015 and latterly was Spokesperson for Small Business, Enterprise and Innovation.

She was re-elected at the 2017 UK general election, with a significantly reduced majority of 3,878 votes (7.4%).

In November 2018, Speaker John Bercow reprimanded Bardell for playing football in the historic debating chamber of the House of Commons at Westminster.

In March 2021, The Sunday Times reported that Bardell suggested a curfew banning men from the streets after 6pm should be considered in areas where women have been killed.

Rehabilitation of offenders
In 2020 Bardell wrote to the Scottish Football Association (SFA) requesting that David Martindale, a convicted drug dealer, be allowed to become manager of Livingston FC.   She tweeted that "The ability to be rehabilitated is a key part of an inclusive society"

Personal life
Bardell is one of at least 45 LGBT MPs in the House of Commons .

Following the 2015 general election, she said: "I only came out to myself and to my family during the election. I then chose not to say anything publicly because I had just got elected and I didn't want it to be one of the first things I said about myself as an MP".

References

External links

 
SNP profile
SNP MP Guardian profiles
Sunday Post SNP MP profiles

1983 births
Living people
21st-century Scottish women politicians
21st-century Scottish politicians
Alumni of the University of Stirling
Female members of the Parliament of the United Kingdom for Scottish constituencies
Lesbian politicians
LGBT members of the Parliament of the United Kingdom
Scottish LGBT politicians
Members of the Parliament of the United Kingdom for Scottish constituencies
People from Livingston, West Lothian
Scottish National Party MPs
Scottish television producers
UK MPs 2015–2017
UK MPs 2017–2019
UK MPs 2019–present
British women television producers